Mount Temple Comprehensive School is a secondary school in Clontarf, Dublin, Ireland. The school operates under the patronage of the Church of Ireland Archbishop of Dublin, and has, as a primary objective, the provision of state-funded second-level education to the Protestant population of northern Dublin, while accepting pupils of all religions and none. The school was established in 1972 following the amalgamation of Mountjoy School, Royal Hibernian Marine School in coastal Clontarf, and Bertrand & Rutland School.

Students
Mount Temple Comprehensive School had about 450 students when it opened in 1972, which rose to over 700 students in the 1980-90s and from 2010 to 2020 had almost 900 students, and rising.

Facilities
The school operates from several buildings, the main house being a protected structure.  There have been plans for many years for a new school building to be added onsite to cater for the extra students, whose numbers are otherwise leading to pressure on space and loss of other facilities to additional classroom need; as of 2022, there is no spare classroom space, nor changing rooms for sport. In 2017, the Department of Education and Skills commissioned a major architectural firm, Wejchert, to design a new main school building, and they assembled a full construction project team.  After Covid-related delays, in October 2020, in response to the last application, the city council planning inspector recommended planning permission be granted, despite some local objections, clearing the way to build a three-storey school building that could accommodate one thousand students.  This building, in excess of 10,000 sq. metres, will replace most of the non-protected school buildings.

In addition to science laboratories and IT space, the school had for many years a substantial lending and reference library with two paid staff and a rota of parent volunteers, and while the collection had to be moved to make space for teaching, the library room hosted a talk by Bono in late 2022. External facilities include a number of on-premises pitches and courts.

History

Three schools
Hibernian Marine School was a charity school founded in 1766, originally to provide for the orphans and children of seamen. The school was originally located in Ringsend, and moved to a new premises on Sir John Rogerson's Quay in 1773. In 1904 it moved to Seafield Road in Clontarf, where the Seacourt estate now stands.

Mountjoy School was a  boarding school in Mountjoy Square (in the same building was the Incorporated Society for Promoting Protestant Schools), founded in 1896. It later moved to the current location in Clontarf in 1948.

Bertrand & Rutland School was in Eccles Street on the northside of Dublin.  It was a Church of Ireland School, which was itself formed formed by a 1947 merger of Rutland School and Bertrand High school, the latter of which was in turn formed by the amalgamation of Bethesda Female Orphan School and Bertrand Female Orphan School in 1943. The Bertrand and Rutland Fund still funds scholarships to Protestant schools in Ireland.

Amalgamations
Hibernian Marine School amalgamated with Mountjoy School in 1968 and became Mountjoy & Marine School. The school later amalgamated with Bertrand & Rutland and took the name of Mount Temple Comprehensive School in 1972.

Site
Mount Temple was once a residence for the agent of the Earl of Charlemont. The present house was built by the magistrate J. C. Stronge in 1860, and was a family home to Elizabeth Bowen. For a period, the estate was owned by Thomas Picton-Bradshaw and known as Bradshaws.  Mountjoy School then took possession in 1949 prior to the merger that formed Mount Temple Comprehensive.

Popular culture
Mount Temple was the school where the rock band U2 was formed. In September 1976, 14-year-old drummer Larry Mullen Jr. posted a notice on the school's noticeboard, looking for fellow musicians. All four members of U2 are former pupils of the school.

Christopher Nolan's autobiographical novel Under the Eye of the Clock, which won the Whitbread Award, is based around his time in Mount Temple. The school now awards "Eye of the Clock Awards" for contributions to school life and academic achievement.

Summer activities onsite
During the summer months the whole school facility is used by the Centre of English Studies (CES), catering for hundreds of international students who come to Dublin to learn English.

Notable alumni

 Shaun Aisbitt, Ireland's tallest man
 Steve Averill, musician, designer working closely with U2
 Bono (Paul David Hewson), frontman of U2, and husband of activist, businesswoman and fellow past pupil, Ali Hewson
 Amanda Brunker, former Miss Ireland
 Linda Brunker, sculptor 
 Diane Caldwell, Irish international footballer
 Catríona Cannon, librarian and academic
 Adam Clayton, musician, best known as the bassist of the Irish rock band U2
 Damien Dempsey, musician
 David Howell "The Edge" Evans, musician, best known as the guitarist, backing vocalist, and keyboardist of the Irish rock band U2
 Dik Evans, brother of David Howell "The Edge" Evans and founder member of The Hype and Feedback, previous incarnations of the band U2
 Frank Ll. Harrison, musicologist
 Ali Hewson, activist, businesswoman and wife of U2 frontman Bono
 Robert Hilliard, Olympic boxer, Church of Ireland minister, journalist, and communist who died fighting with the International Brigades during the Spanish Civil War
 Mick Kearney, player with Leinster Rugby
 Becky Lynch, professional wrestler (WWE)
 Andrew Maxwell, comedian
 Alan Maybury, Irish football international
 Neil McCormick, music journalist
 Sir David McMurtry, industrialist, co-founder of metrology company Renishaw plc, based in Wotton-under-Edge. 
 Larry Mullen Jr., musician and the drummer for the rock band U2
 Christopher Nolan, author
 Mark O'Neill, television presenter
 Duncan Smith, Labour Party TD for Dublin Fingal

Notable faculty
 Elspeth Henderson, president of Irish Girl Guides
 Patrick Hughes, former Irish cricket international
 Colin McKenzie, head of Irish Kidney Association 
 Gerard Stembridge, writer, director and actor

References

External links
Mount Temple Comprehensive School - official website

Mount Temple Comprehensive School
Secondary schools in Dublin (city)
Anglican schools in the Republic of Ireland